The U.S. state of Florida has had a system of direct voting since 1886, as the Florida Constitution of 1885 required voter approval for all constitutional amendments. Since then, the system has undergone several overhauls. In 1968, voters approved an amendment creating an initiative and referendum system.

Background 
The Florida Constitution of 1885 carried a section requiring voter approval for all constitutional amendments. This system remained largely unchanged until 1968, when an amendment was passed creating a system by which citizens could place amendments on the ballot using the initiative process. Since then, state officials have regularly attempted to restrict the systems use, including by charging for signature verification, requiring amendments to reach 60% approval to pass, and restricting signature collection. As a result of these restrictions, Florida is one of the few states in which paid signature collectors are commonplace. In 2021, the state legislature passed a bill limiting individual contributions to ballot measure campaigns to $3,000, claiming that such a restriction would reduce fraud. In 2022, a federal judge blocked the bill from going into effect, citing donors First Amendment rights as the core legal reasoning.

Some ballot measures passed in Florida have been the subject of controversy or extended discussion. In 2000, a ballot measure requiring a high-speed rail project be started within 3 years was passed. The measure, which had been the subject of lengthy legal proceedings before making it onto the ballot, was estimated to cost at least $5 billon. After several years of little progress, a second ballot measure repealing the requirement passed with 64% of the vote in 2004. In 2008, Amendment 2 banning same-sex marriages passed with 62% of the vote, along with similar measures in Arizona, Florida, and Arkansas. A study of the vote by the University of Florida later found that lower education levels were a strong predictor of support for the measure. In 2018, Florida voters passed Amendment 4, which extended voting rights to most former felons who had completed their sentences. Despite passing with 65% of the vote, state officials were slow to implement the updated guidelines, preventing many newly eligible voters from voting for several years. In 2022, Amendment 4 was reintroduced to the public eye after Governor Ron DeSantis announced the prosecution of twenty former felons who had been misled into thinking they were eligible to vote under the Amendment.

Several academic studies of Florida ballot measures and their connections to other aspects of the political sphere have been conducted. A study of the language used by ballot measures found that voters were more likely to support ballot measures with a "local" framing than ones with a statewide or national framing. Another study examining petition signing found that Florida residents who signed ballot measure petitions were significantly more likely to vote in the upcoming election regardless of whether the measure they supported made it to the ballot. An analysis of newspaper endorsements found that even if voters in Florida disagreed with a newspaper's political alignment, a newspaper's endorsement of a ballot measure was positively connected to that measure passing or failing.

Types of ballot measures 

There are several types of ballot measures in Florida, including a mix of citizen-initiated types and government-initiated types.

 Citizen-initiated constitutional amendments, which are placed on the ballot after receiving signatures equal to at least 8% of voters in the previous election in at least 14 of Florida's congressional districts
 Legislatively-referred constitutional amendments, which are placed on the ballot after being passed by the legislature
 Commission-referred constitutional amendments, which are placed on the ballot by the authority of the Florida Constitution Revision Commission
 Advisory questions, automatic ballot referrals, constitutional convention referrals, and legislatively referred state statues have also appeared on the ballot occasionally

1800s

1886

1890

1892

1894

1896

1898

1900–1949

1900

1902

1904

1906

1908

1910

1912

1914

1916

1918

1920

1922

1924

1926

1928

1930

1932

1934

1936

1938

1940

1942

1944

1946

1948

1950–1999

1950

1952

1954

1956

1958

1959

1960

1962

1963

1964

1965

1966

1968

1969

1970

1971

1972

1974

1976

1978

1980

1982

1984

1986

1988

1990

1992

1994

1996

1998

2000–

2000

2002

2004

2006

2008

2010

2012

2014

2016

2018

2020

2022

See also 
 Elections in Florida
 Law of Florida

Notes

References 

Lists of referendums
Florida elections
Florida law
Florida ballot measures